Blackrock is a rural locality in the Shire of Hinchinbrook, Queensland, Australia. In the  Blackrock had a population of 320 people.

History 
The locality was officially named and bounded on 27 April 2001.

In the  Blackrock had a population of 320 people.

References 

Shire of Hinchinbrook
Localities in Queensland